Barison may refer to:

 Barison Peninsula, on the Antarctic Peninsula
 Barison II of Arborea (died 1186), ruler of a Sardinian kingdom
 Barisone I of Torres or Barison I (died 1073), ruler of a Sardinian kingdom
 Barisone II of Torres or Barison II (died 1191), ruler of a Sardinian kingdom
 Barisone III of Torres or Barison III (1221-1236), ruler of a Sardinian kingdom
 Giuseppe Barison (1853-1931), Italian artist
 Paolo Barison (1936-1979), Italian soccer player

See also 
 Barrison (disambiguation)